Taouzient is a town and commune in Khenchela Province, Algeria.

References

Communes of Khenchela Province